Milak (also Romanized as Mīlak) is a village in Rudbar-e Shahrestan Rural District, Alamut-e Gharbi District, Qazvin County, Qazvin Province, Iran. At the 2006 census, its population was 64, in 30 families.

Notable people
Yousef Alikhani, writer, born in Milak in 1975.

References 

Populated places in Qazvin County